Serbian League West is a section of the Serbian League, Serbia's third-tier football league. Teams from the western part of Serbia are in this section of the league. The other sections are Serbian League East, Serbian League Vojvodina, and Serbian League Belgrade.

League table

Serbian League West seasons
3
Serb